Slobodka may refer to:

 Slobodka, Russia, several rural localities in Russia
 Slabodka yeshiva (disambiguation)
 Slobodke (or Slabodke), the Yiddish name for Vilijampolė, a neighborhood of Kaunas, Lithuania

See also
 Sloboda (disambiguation)
 Slobodskoy (disambiguation)
 Słobódka (disambiguation)